The ASAIO Journal is a peer-reviewed medical journal covering research and development of artificial organs. It is published by Wolters Kluwer on behalf of the American Society for Artificial Internal Organs (ASAIO) and the editor-in-chief is Mark S. Slaughter, MD (University of Louisville). It was established in 1955 as the Transactions of the American Society for Artificial Internal Organs to publish the proceedings of the annual ASAIO conference. It obtained its current title in 1992. The journal publishes monthly. 

The journal offers an open access publication option to authors. In addition, letters to the editors, invited commentaries, case reports, brief communications, and how to do it articles are published free for all to access. All journal content is free to access one year post-publication.

Editors-in-chief
The following persons are or have been editor-in-chief:
Peter Salisbury, 1955
George H.A. Clowes 1956
George Schreiner, 1957–1985
Eli Friedman, 1986–2003
Joseph Zwischenberger, 2004–2013
Mark Slaughter, 2013–present

Abstracting and indexing 
The journal is abstracted and indexed in:

Current Contents/Clinical Medicine

Ei Compendex

Embase

Index Medicus/MEDLINE/PubMed

Science Citation Index,

Scopus

According to the Journal Citation Reports, the journal has a 2020 impact factor of 2.872.

References

External links 

Organ transplantation journals
Biomedical engineering journals
Bimonthly journals
Publications established in 1955
Wolters Kluwer academic journals
English-language journals